Taveh Kabud (also Romanized as Tāveh Kabūd; also known as Tāvar Kabūd) is a village in Hoseyniyeh Rural District, Alvar-e Garmsiri District, Andimeshk County, Khuzestan Province, Iran. At the 2006 census, its population was 49, in 10 families.

References 

Populated places in Andimeshk County